Teresa Kotlarczyk (born 10 October 1955) is a Polish film director and screenwriter. Her 1990 film The Bet was entered into the 17th Moscow International Film Festival.

Selected filmography
 Regina (TV series) (2007)
 Prymas.Trzy lata z tysiąca (2000)
 The Bet (1990)
 Kalejdoskop (Kaleidoscope) (1986)

References

External links

 Teresa Kotlarczyk at the Filmpolski Database 
 Teresa Kotlarczyk - Polish Film Festival in Los Angeles in 2015

1955 births
Living people
Polish film directors
Polish women film directors
Polish screenwriters
Polish women screenwriters
People from Oświęcim